Maple Hill Cemetery may refer to:

 Maple Hill Cemetery (Huntsville, Alabama)
Maple Hill Cemetery (Helena-West Helena, Arkansas), listed on the NRHP in Phillips County, Arkansas